The following is a list of Iranian actresses in alphabetical order.

A 
Aram
Bahareh Afshari
 Golab Adineh
 Mahnaz Afshar
 Shohreh Aghdashloo
 Pegah Ahangarani
 Taraneh Alidoosti
 Zar Amir Ebrahimi
 Mary Apick
 Afsar Asadi
 Vishka Asayesh
 Tala Ashe
 Rana Azadivar
Nasim Adabi
Khatereh Asadi

B 
 Asal Badiee
Nazanin Bayati
 Pantea Bahram
Bahari Ibaadat
 Behnoosh Bakhtyari
 Pouri Banayi
 Afsaneh Bayegan
 Shiva Boloorian
 Nazanin Boniadi
 Nikohl Boosheri
 Anna Borkowska
Sareh Bayat
Sara Bahrami

D 
 Shaghayegh Dehghan
 Sahar Dolatshahi
Anahita Dargahi

E 

 Setare Eskandari

F 
 Ateneh Faghih Nasiri
 Golshifteh Farahani
 Shaghayegh Farahani
 Farimah Farjami
 Bita Farrahi
 Shamsi Fazlollahi
 Hadis Fooladvand
 Negar Foroozandeh
 Leila Forouhar

G 
 Vida Ghahremani
 Soraya Ghasemi
 Shabnam Gholikhani
 Parastoo Golestani
 Googoosh
Sahar Ghoreyshi
 Fatemeh Gudarzi
Hengame Ghaziani
Soraya Ghasemi

H 
Azita Hajian
 Mitra Hajjar
 Elham Hamidi
 Fatemeh Hashemi
 Leila Hatami
 Anahita Hemmati
Elahe Hesari
Farrokhlagha Houshmand

I 

 Parinaz Izadyar

J 
 Behnaz Jafari
 Maryam Amir Jalali
 Negar Javaherian
 Fereshteh Jenabi
 Falamak Joneidi
 Mandana Jones

K 
 Saba Kamali
 Niki Karimi
 Mahtab Keramati
 Anahita Khalatbari
 Hamideh Kheirabadi
 Gohar Kheirandish
 Shila Khodadad
 Sara Khoeniha
 Negin Kianfar
 Baran Kosari

M 
 Hengameh Mofid
 Shabnam Moghaddamy
 Akram Mohammadi
 Aida Mohammadkhani
 Zohreh Mojabi
 Ladan Mostofi
 Fatemeh Motamed-Arya
Roya Mirelmi

N 
 Yekta Naser
Azade Namdari
 Ana Nemati
 Roya Nonahali

O 

 Leila Otadi

P 
 Maryam Palizban
 Mahaya Petrosian
 Laleh Pourkarim

R 
 Bahare Rahnama
 Leili Rashidi
 Fahimeh Rastkar
 Atefeh Razavi
 Katayoun Riahi
 Shahla Riahi
 Shiva Rose
 Homa Rousta

S 
 Golchehreh Sajadiye
Azadeh Samadi
 Roohangiz Saminejad
 Annik Shefrazian
 Sarah Shahi
Yara Shahidi
 Elnaz Shakerdoust
 Mehraveh Sharifinia
 Jamileh Sheykhi
 Parvin Soleimani
 Parvaneh Soltani
 Bahar Soomekh
Jamile Sheykhi

T 
 Behnoosh Tabatabaei
 Jasmin Tabatabai
 Sadaf Taherian
 Farzaneh Taidi
 Susan Taslimi
 Hanieh Tavassoli
 Hedyeh Tehrani
 Roya Teymourian
 Shabnam Tolouei

V 
 Sahar Valadbeigi
 Marzieh Vafamehr

Z 
Sahar Zakaria
Laya Zanganeh
Merila Zarei
Irene Zazians
Niusha Zeighami
Leyla Zareh

Actresses
Iranian
 
Iranian